Ahmet Nihat Berker (born 20 September 1949 in Istanbul), is a Turkish scientist, theoretical chemist, physicist and emeritus professor of physics at MIT. Currently, he is the acting Dean of Engineering and Natural Sciences in Kadir Has University, Turkey. He is the son of a notable scientist and engineer Ratip Berker, who was deceased on 17 October 1997. His wife, Bedia Erim Berker is a professor of chemistry at Istanbul Technical University, and one of his sons, Selim Berker is a professor of epistemology in the department of philosophy at Harvard University and his other son, Ratip Emin Berker is currently a junior at Harvard.

Academic life
After graduating from Robert College at first place in 1967, Nihat Berker received B.S. degrees in physics and chemistry from MIT in 1971. He received his M.S. and PhD degrees in physics from University of Illinois at Urbana–Champaign in 1972 and 1977, respectively. During 1977–79, he was a postdoctoral research fellow in the department of physics at Harvard University. He was an assistant professor during 1979–82, associate professor during 1982–1988, and professor of theoretical physics during 1988–04 at MIT. From 1999 to 2004, he served as a professor and dean of the School of Sciences and Letters at The Istanbul Technical University. After losing the president (rector) elections in İTÜ, he left the Technical University of Istanbul for a professor position at Koç University. He became emeritus professor of Physics at MIT in 2004. He was an adjunct professor of Boğaziçi University in Bebek, İstanbul between 1996 and 2004, as well. During 2005–2009, he served as a professor of physics at Koç University, Rumelifeneri, Sarıyer, Istanbul. From 2009 until his resignation on 11 September 2016, he was the president of Sabancı University in Tuzla, Istanbul. Currently, he is the acting dean of the faculty of engineering and natural sciences at Kadir Has University.

Research areas
Nihat Berker is best known for his research in statistical mechanics, especially on phase transitions applying renormalization group theory, with applications to surface physics and materials with defects.

References

Massachusetts Institute of Technology School of Science alumni
Grainger College of Engineering alumni
Massachusetts Institute of Technology School of Science faculty
Academic staff of Istanbul Technical University
Academic staff of Sabancı University
Theoretical physicists
Turkish physicists
Turkish chemists
Fellows of the American Physical Society
Humboldt Research Award recipients
Recipients of TÜBİTAK Science Award
Members of the Turkish Academy of Sciences
Rectors of universities and colleges in Turkey
Living people
1949 births